Love Letter is a card game introduced in May 2012 and designed by Seiji Kanai. Its first English-language edition was produced in the United States by Alderac Entertainment Group (AEG) until 2018, when Love Letter was acquired by Z-Man Games (a subsidiary of Asmodee).

Premise
Each player aims to deliver a love letter to the Princess with the assistance of relatives and acquaintances.

Gameplay
At the start of each round, one card is discarded face-down (so the process of elimination cannot be used to prove which cards are left for the round), one card is dealt to each player and the rest are deposited face-down into a deck in the middle. During each player's turn, one card is drawn from the deck and the player gets to play either that card or the card already in their hand. After processing the effect described on the played card, the next player to the left gets a turn. This process is repeated until either the deck runs out, in which case the player holding the highest-value card wins the round, or all players but one are eliminated, in which case the last player still in play wins the round.

Once a round ends, the winner of the round receives a favor token. All cards are collected and shuffled, and play continues with a new round, with the winner of the previous round taking the first turn. The game ends when one player has obtained a predetermined number of favor tokens (from 3 to 7, depending on the number of players), winning the game for that player.

Card types
Below is the list of cards in the original edition of the game:

Second Edition
A second edition of Love Letter was released in 2019 with new artwork and the addition of five cards to support play by 2–6 players. This edition carries over all the cards from the original version, but changes the strength values of the King, the Countess and the Princess to 7, 8 and 9 respectively. The five cards added in this edition include one additional Guard card and the following new cards:

This edition can also be played in accordance with the original version by removing the five additional cards, though this only supports 2–4 players.

Awards won
Love Letter has received the following awards:
2014 Deutscher Spiele Preis, 4th place
2014 Spiel des Jahres recommended
2014 Origin Awards Best Traditional Card Game
2014 Guildbrikken Best Family Game
2014 Fairplay A la Carte
2013 Golden Geek Best Party Board Game
2013 Golden Geek Best Innovative Board Game
2013 Golden Geek Best Family Board Game
2013 Golden Geek Best Card Game
2012 Japan Boardgame Prize Voters' Selection
2012 Dice Tower Best Family Game
2012 Origins Award for Best Traditional Card Game

Editions
In addition to foreign language editions, many are themed:

References

External links

Official site
Rules

Card games introduced in 2012
Dedicated deck card games
Origins Award winners
Draw and discard games